is a leading English contract law case. It gives a good example of the rule that a clause cannot be incorporated after a contract has been concluded, without reasonable notice before. Also, it was held that an automatic ticket machine was an offer, rather than an invitation to treat.

Although the case is important for these two propositions, today any exclusion of negligence liability for personal injury by businesses is prohibited by the Unfair Contract Terms Act 1977 s 2(1) and the Unfair Terms in Consumer Contracts Regulations 1999 Sch 2, para(a).

Facts
Francis Thornton, "a free lance trumpeter of the highest quality", drove to the entrance of the multi-storey car park on Shoe Lane, before attending a performance at Farringdon Hall with the BBC. He took a ticket from the ticket machine and parked his car. It said

"This ticket is issued subject to the conditions of issue as displayed on the premises".

On the car park pillars near the paying office there was a list, one excluding liability for

"injury to the Customer … howsoever that loss, misdelivery, damage or injury shall be caused".

Three hours later he had an accident before getting into his car. The car park operator argued that the judge should have held the matter regulated by this contract, not tort.

Judgment
Lord Denning MR held that the more onerous the clause, the better notice of it needed to be given. Moreover, the contract was already concluded when the ticket came out of the machine, and so any condition on it could not be incorporated in the contract.

Megaw LJ and Sir Gordon Willmer agreed with the onerous point, but reserved their opinions on where the contract was concluded. Furthermore, Sir Gordon distinguished this from the other ticket cases based upon the fact that a human clerk proffered the ticket and the buyer had the opportunity to say I do not like those conditions.

See also

Parker v South Eastern Railway Company (1877) 2 CPD 416 
Chapelton v Barry UDC [1940] 1 KB 532 
Olley v Marlborough Court Hotel [1949] 1 KB 532
J Spurling Ltd v Bradshaw [1956] 1 WLR 461 
Interfoto Picture Library Ltd v Stiletto Visual Programmes Ltd [1989] QB 433
George Mitchell v Finney Lock Seeds Ltd [1983] QB 284

Notes

References

External links
 Full text of the decision at BAILII

Lord Denning cases
English incorporation case law
English unfair terms case law
1970 in British law
Court of Appeal (England and Wales) cases
1970 in case law